"Shadows" is the third single to be taken from The Getaway Plan's debut album Other Voices, Other Rooms. In Australia, only 1000 copies were made and the single is considered rare.

Track listings
CD Single
 "Shadows" - 3:41
 "Melophobia" - 3:46
 "Teardrop" (Massive Attack cover) - 5:36

Charts

Release history

References

2008 singles
2008 songs